Ghost Dad is a 1990 American fantasy comedy film directed by Sidney Poitier (in his final directorial effort) and starring Bill Cosby, in which a widower's spirit is able to communicate with his children after his death. It was critically panned and was a box office bomb.

The film was nominated for three Young Artist Awards.

Plot
Elliot Hopper (Bill Cosby) is a workaholic widower who is about to land the deal of a lifetime at work, which he hopes will win him a promotion and a company car. After he forgets his daughter Diane's birthday, he attempts to make it up to her by promising her she can have his car when he secures the deal at work on the coming Thursday. After being persuaded to give the car to his daughter early, Elliot must hail a taxi from work, which is driven by Satanist Curtis Burch (Raynor Scheine), who drives erratically and is out of control. Attempting to get the taxi stopped, Elliot announces that he is Satan and commands him to stop the taxi, and also attempts to give him his wallet. Shocked to see his "Evil Master", Burch drives off a bridge and into the river.

Elliot emerges from the accident scene, only to learn that he is a ghost when a police officer fails to notice him and a speeding bus goes straight through him. When he gets home he discovers that his three children can see him, but only in a totally dark room, and they cannot hear him at times. He struggles to tell them what happened when he is whisked away to London by paranormal researcher Sir Edith Moser (Ian Bannen), who tells him he is a ghost who has yet to enter the afterlife because "they screwed up"; his soul will not cross over until Thursday.

The pressures of work and family life lead to many comedic events, as Elliot attempts to renew his life insurance policy and complete his company's merger, so his family will be provided for once he crosses over. One day, he must choose between staying in an important work meeting and helping his son with a magic trick at school. He eventually decides that his family's happiness is more important and walks out on his furious boss, Mr. Collins (Barry Corbin), who later smugly fires him. Dejected, Elliot reveals himself as a ghost to his love interest, Joan (Denise Nicholas), whose initial shock soon turns to sympathy.

Edith arrives from London to announce that Elliot is not dead; his spirit jumped out of his body in fright. They also work out that the only previous known case of this happening was Elliot's father. In the excitement to find Elliot's body to reunite his spirit with it, Diane trips on a pair of skates that her little sister, Amanda, left on the stairs; she falls and is seriously injured. The family rush her to the hospital where her spirit has also jumped out of her body. As she delightedly flies around, Elliot begs her to re-enter her body; his own has started to "flicker". When he collapses, Diane becomes concerned and races into the intensive-care unit to find her father's body. She helps him into the room and they discover that Burch had swapped wallets with Elliot, meaning Elliot was wrongly identified by the hospital as Burch. Elliot returns to his body and wakes up; Diane does the same and jumps off the operating table to tell the family what has happened.

As the reunited family leave the hospital, Elliot spots a yellow taxi parked outside and goes to look inside. He sees Curtis Burch behind the wheel. Delighted to see his "Evil Master", Burch returns Elliot's wallet and tells Elliot he will do whatever Elliot commands. Elliot commands Burch to go to hell and sit on red-hot coals waiting for him "until it snows". Curtis agrees enthusiastically and drives off while Elliot, Joan, Edith, and the family leave the hospital.

Cast
 Bill Cosby as Elliot Hopper
 Kimberly Russell as Diane Hopper
 Denise Nicholas as Joan
 Salim Grant as Danny Hopper
 Brooke Fontaine as Amanda Hopper
 Ian Bannen as Sir Edith Moser
 Christine Ebersole as Carol
 Barry Corbin as Mr. Emery Collins
 Dana Ashbrook as Tony Ricker
 Omar Gooding as Stuart
 Arnold Stang as Mr. Cohen
 Dakin Matthews as Mr. Seymour
 Raynor Scheine as Curtis Burch
 Brian Stokes Mitchell as Teacher

Pre-production
Early in development, John Badham was slated to direct the film with Steve Martin as Elliot Hopper. Badham and Martin left the project for unknown reasons, and Universal hired Sidney Poitier and Bill Cosby to be their respective replacements.

Novelization

As part of the publicity for the movie, a Ghost Dad novelization written by Mel Cebulash was released the year of the film's debut.

Reception

Critical response
On review aggregator Rotten Tomatoes the film holds an approval rating of 6% based on 31 reviews, with an average rating of 3.30/10. The site's critics consensus states: "A startlingly misconceived effort from director Sidney Poitier and star Bill Cosby, Ghost Dad is a listless, glacially-paced comedy that's alternately schmaltzy and incomprehensible." Audiences polled by CinemaScore gave the film an average grade of "A−" on an A+ to F scale.

Rating the movie half a star out of four, Chicago Sun-Times film critic Roger Ebert characterized it as "a desperately unfunny film—a strained, contrived construction that left me shaking my head in amazement ... How could Sidney Poitier, a skilled filmmaker with an actor's sense of timing, have been the director of this mess? How did a production executive go for it? Who ever thought this was a good idea? Vincent Canby of The New York Times called it " unctuous, flat and phony, a farce that has the pace of a Broadway bus at rush hour."

Box office
In the film's opening weekend, it earned $4,803,480. Domestically the film earned $24,707,633 and $714,000 at the international box office for a total of $25,421,633.

Home media
Ghost Dad was released on VHS by MCA/Universal Home Video on December 6, 1990. The film was released on DVD by Good Times Video on May 1, 2001, and as a "Studio Selections" DVD by Universal Studios on March 1, 2005.

TV version
Twelve minutes' worth of deleted scenes were shown on television on NBC and on USA Network.

Modern references
On November 1, 2000, Ghost Dad was parodied in The Simpsons "Treehouse of Horror XI", in which Homer Simpson died after consuming broccoli and was required to perform one good deed within 24 hours in order to not be sentenced to an eternity in Hell.

In the Family Guy episode "Brian Does Hollywood", Stewie appears on an episode of Kids Say the Darndest Things, Cosby's show. When Cosby inadvertently hypnotizes Stewie with his own device, Stewie says "Ghost Dad was the best movie I've seen since Leonard Part 6", referencing another infamous flop Cosby made.

In the video game Barkley, Shut Up and Jam: Gaiden, published in January 2008, the protagonist is required to fight and slay "Ghost Dad", who has been terrorizing the ruins of Proto-Neo-New York, in order to lift the fog bank that prevents passage to the Spalding Building. He is featured as a ghost with Bill Cosby's face superimposed shoddily onto its body.

In the Bob's Burgers episode "Crawl Space", Bob answers questions for Loise's friends while acting as a ghost trapped in the walls. One of her friends asks him if he's "the ghost dad from Ghost Dad."

See also
 List of ghost films

References

External links
 
 

1990 films
1990s English-language films
American fantasy comedy films
1990s fantasy comedy films
1990s ghost films
American ghost films
Films directed by Sidney Poitier
Universal Pictures films
African-American comedy films
Films scored by Henry Mancini
Films shot in Idaho
1990 comedy films
1990s American films